Tegan Lauren-Hannah Murray (born 1 July 1989) is an English actress. She played Cassie in Skins (2007–2008, 2013) and Gilly in the HBO fantasy series Game of Thrones (2012–2019), for which she has been nominated along with her castmates for three Screen Actors Guild Awards. Her film roles include the 2014 musical romance film Stuart Murdoch's God Help The Girl which won her a Special Jury Prize at the Sundance Film Festival, and 2015 drama film Jeppe Rønde's Bridgend for which she won the Tribeca Film Festival for Best Actress Award.

Between her screen roles she appeared on stage in Polly Stenham's play That Face in West End (2008) and in the Off West End play Martine (2014).

Early life
Murray was born on 1 July 1989 in Bristol. Her parents work at the University of Bristol, her father as a professor and her mother as a research technician. She earned an English degree at Queens' College, Cambridge. She attended North Bristol Post 16 Centre, and was a member of the Bristol Old Vic Young Company.

Career
At the age of 17, Murray heard about an audition for young actors in Bristol, and decided to audition for the experience. The auditions were for the E4 teen drama series Skins. She impressed the producers of the series and was cast as Cassie Ainsworth, a gentle and creative but self-destructive teenager with an eating disorder. Murray and April Pearson were the first two to be cast on the show. Murray went on to appear in the first two series, from 2007 to 2008. She left at the end of the show's second series to make way for a new generation of characters. On the decision to replace the cast, Murray has said that "it would be really silly to be in a teenage drama if you're no longer a teenager".

Following Skins in May 2008, Murray made her stage debut as Mia in the critically acclaimed That Face, a West End production at the Duke of York's Theatre. She was highly praised for her acting in the play, and it was considered a milestone in her career. That same year, she had a small role in the black comedy In Bruges, but her scene was cut from the film.

In 2009, Murray appeared in the ITV adaptation of Agatha Christie's novel Why Didn't They Ask Evans?, playing Dorothy Savage. She also appeared in the thriller film Womb (2010). Later that year, Murray starred in an adaptation of Enda Walsh's Chatroom. The film premiered at the 2010 Cannes Film Festival. In early January, she appeared in the British television thriller Above Suspicion: the Red Dahlia, an adaptation of Linda La Plante's novel, in a small role.

On 8 August 2011, HBO confirmed that Murray would portray Gilly in the second and third seasons of Game of Thrones. She was upgraded to a series regular for the fourth season. Her character is a young woman who has a baby by her own father, and becomes protected by the character Samwell Tarly. In 2012, she appeared in the action thriller film The Numbers Station.

In 2013, Murray appeared in a two-episode feature, in the seventh and final series of Skins, where she reprised her role as a more serious, solemn, and independent adult Cassie Ainsworth. She also starred in the music video for "Your Cover's Blown" by Belle & Sebastian.

In 2014, Murray starred in God Help the Girl, about three musicians in Glasgow. The film premiered at the Sundance Film Festival in January 2014, and Murray shared the World Cinema Dramatic Special Jury Award for the Delightful Ensemble Performance. Later that year she continued her role as Gilly in Game of Thrones season 4. She also starred in the acclaimed revival of Jean-Jacques Bernard’s play Martine, playing the title role. Her performance was considered one of the most beautiful and heartbreaking of the year by the public and critics, and she was nominated for Best Female Performance at the Off West End Awards.

Murray starred in Lily & Kat (2015), an independent American film and the first feature directed by Micael Preysler, about inseparable best friends who struggle to make the best of their last few days together, savouring the city nightlife with an enigmatic artist one of them takes a liking to.

In 2015 she played Sara in the Danish film Bridgend, based on the Bridgend suicides of South Wales. The film premiered at the Rotterdam Film Festival, and received positive reviews. The film then had its North American premiere at the Tribeca Film Festival where it won 3 awards, including Murray for Best Actress.

In 2016 Murray played Sylvia Ageloff, a young Jewish American intellectual from Brooklyn and a confidante of Trotsky, in the film The Chosen.

In 2017, Murray starred in Kathryn Bigelow's drama Detroit, based on the Algiers Motel incident during Detroit's 1967 12th Street Riot. The film was critically acclaimed.

In 2018, she played the lead role of Leslie "Lulu" Van Houten, the American convicted murderer and former member of the Manson Family, in the film Charlie Says by Mary Harron. The movie premiered at the 75th Venice International Film Festival and was based on the books The Family, by Ed Sanders, and The Long Prison Journey of Leslie Van Houten, by Karlene Faith.

Filmography

Film

Television

Stage

Radio

Music videos

Video games

Awards and nominations

References

External links

 

1989 births
Living people
21st-century English actresses
Actresses from Bristol
Alumni of Queens' College, Cambridge
English film actresses
English radio actresses
English stage actresses
English television actresses